Cryptopone  is a genus of ants in the subfamily Ponerinae. The genus has a worldwide distribution, with most species occurring in Asia. Workers range from very small to medium in size (1.7–6.1 mm), with the queens being slightly larger.

Species

Cryptopone arabica Collingwood & Agosti, 1996
Cryptopone butteli Forel, 1913
Cryptopone crassicornis (Emery, 1897)
Cryptopone emeryi Donisthorpe, 1943
Cryptopone fusciceps Emery, 1900
Cryptopone gigas Wu & Wang, 1995
Cryptopone gilva (Roger, 1863)
Cryptopone guianensis (Weber, 1939)
Cryptopone hartwigi Arnold, 1948
Cryptopone holmgreni (Wheeler, 1925)
Cryptopone jinxiuensis Zhou, 2001
Cryptopone mirabilis MacKay & MacKay, 2010
Cryptopone motschulskyi Donisthorpe, 1943
Cryptopone nicobarensis Forel, 1905
Cryptopone ochracea (Mayr, 1855)
Cryptopone pseudogigas Zhou & Zheng, 1997
Cryptopone recticlypea Xu, 1998
Cryptopone rotundiceps (Emery, 1914)
Cryptopone sauteri (Wheeler, 1906)
Cryptopone sinensis Wang, 1992
Cryptopone subterranea Bharti & Wachkoo, 2013
Cryptopone taivanae (Forel, 1913)
Cryptopone tengu Terayama, 1999
Cryptopone testacea Emery, 1893
Cryptopone typhlos (Karavaiev, 1935)

References

External links

Ponerinae
Ant genera